The 2006 Davis Cup was the 95th edition of the most important tournament between nations in men's tennis. Sixteen teams participated in the World Group and 125 participated in total. The first round matches were played 10–12 February and the final took place 1–3 December 2006 at the Olympic Stadium, Moscow, with Russia defeating Argentina.

World Group

Draw

First round losers play along with Zonal Group I qualifiers in World Group play-offs.

Final

World Group play-offs

Date: 22–24 September

Americas Zone

Group I
 — advanced to World Group play-offs

 — relegated to Group II in 2007
 — advanced to World Group play-offs

Group II
 — relegated to Group III in 2007
 — promoted to Group I in 2007

 — relegated to Group III in 2007

Group III
 — promoted to Group II in 2007
 — promoted to Group II in 2007

 — relegated to Group IV in 2007
 — relegated to Group IV in 2007

Group IV
 — promoted to Group III in 2007
 — promoted to Group III in 2007

Asia/Oceania Zone

Group I

 — advanced to World Group play-offs
 — relegated to Group II in 2007
 — advanced to World Group play-offs

Group II

 — promoted to Group I in 2007

 — relegated to Group III in 2007
 — relegated to Group III in 2007

 Pacific Oceania

Group III
 — promoted to Group II in 2007
 — promoted to Group II in 2007

 — relegated to Group IV in 2007
 — relegated to Group IV in 2007

Group IV
Pool A
 — promoted to Group III in 2007

Pool B
 — promoted to Group III in 2007

Europe/Africa Zone

Group I
 — advanced to World Group play-offs
 — advanced to World Group play-offs
 — advanced to World Group play-offs
 — advanced to World Group play-offs

 

 — relegated to Group II in 2007 
 — relegated to Group II in 2007

Group II

 — relegated to Group III in 2007

 — promoted to Group I in 2007

 — relegated to Group III in 2007

 — promoted to Group I in 2007

 — relegated to Group III in 2007
 — relegated to Group III in 2007

Group III
Venue 1
 — promoted to Group II in 2007
 — promoted to Group II in 2007

 — relegated to Group IV in 2007
 — relegated to Group IV in 2007

Venue 2
 — promoted to Group II in 2007
 — promoted to Group II in 2007

 — relegated to Group IV in 2007
 — relegated to Group IV in 2007

Group IV
 — promoted to Group III in 2007
 — promoted to Group III in 2007
 — promoted to Group III in 2007
 — promoted to Group III in 2007

 (withdrew)

See also
Davis Cup

References

External links
Official website

 
Davis Cup
Davis Cups by year